Henry Kingsley (2 January 1830 – 24 May 1876) was an English novelist, brother of the better-known Charles Kingsley. He was an early exponent of muscular Christianity in an 1859 work, The Recollections of Geoffry Hamlyn.

Life
Kingsley was born at Barnack Rectory, Northamptonshire, the son of the Rev. Charles Kingsley the elder and Mary, née Lucas. 
Charles Kingsley came of a long line of clergymen and soldiers. There were several writers in the family besides Henry and Charles, including Mary Kingsley, an explorer and writer, Charlotte Kingsley Chanter, a botanical writer and novelist, and George Kingsley, a traveller and writer.

Henry Kingsley's boyhood was spent at Clovelly and Chelsea, before attending King's College School, King's College London, and Worcester College, Oxford, which he left without graduating.
An opportune legacy from a relation enabled him to leave Oxford free of debt and emigrate to Australia. He arrived in Melbourne in the Gauntlet in December 1853 with Henry Venables. He became involved in gold-digging, and later joined the mounted police.

For some time Kingsley had little or no money and carried his swag from station to station. Philip Russell stated in 1887 that he employed Kingsley at his station Langa-Willi, and that Geoffry Hamlyn (1859) was begun there. Miss Rose Browne, daughter of "Rolf Boldrewood", stated it was on her father's suggestion that Kingsley began to write. Russell's story is confirmed by her further statement that her father gave Kingsley a letter to Mr Mitchell of Langa-Willi, that he stayed with Mitchell, and there wrote Geoffry Hamlyn.

On his return to the UK in 1857, Kingsley devoted himself to literature, and wrote several well-regarded novels, including Geoffry Hamlyn, set in Colebrooke, Devon, and Australia, which the late 19th-century English author George Gissing called "unliterary stuff", The Hillyars and the Burtons (1865), Ravenshoe (1861) and Austin Elliot (1863). Ravenshoe is generally seen as the best. Henry Kingsley married Sarah Maria Haselwood on 19 July 1864. In 1869, he moved to Edinburgh to edit the Daily Review, but soon gave this up and in 1870 became war correspondent for the paper in the Franco-German War.

Kingsley also published Leighton Court (1866), Mademoiselle Mathilde (1868), Tales of Old Travel Re-narrated (1869), Stretton (1869), The Boy in Grey (1871), Hetty and other Stories (1871), Old Margaret (1871), Hornby Mills and other Stories (1872), Valentine (1872), The Harveys (1872), Oakshott Castle (1873), Reginald Hetherege (1874), Number Seventeen (1875), The Grange Garden (1876), Fireside Studies (Essays) (1876), and The Mystery of the Island (1877).

Kingsley and his wife moved to Cuckfield, Sussex late in 1874, where Kingsley died of cancer of the tongue on 24 May 1876.

Further reading

References

Attribution

External links

Henry Kingsley brief bio from National Library of Australia

19th-century English novelists
English emigrants to Australia
1830 births
1876 deaths
People educated at King's College School, London
Alumni of King's College London
People from Barnack
Deaths from oral cancer
Deaths from cancer in England
English male novelists
19th-century male writers
Victorian novelists
Burials in Sussex